Hemipterochilis is a genus of potter wasps.

Species
There are at least three species:

References

Potter wasps
Hymenoptera genera
Hymenoptera of Africa